The New York Sephardic Jewish Film Festival (NYSJFF), also known as the Sephardic Film Festival, is an annual New York City Film festival sponsored by the American Sephardi Federation. It was founded in 1990. The 20th Anniversary Edition of the festival was from March 30 to April 6, 2017.

The festival showcases films about Jewish communities of the Mediterranean and Asia, including Morocco, Yemen, Ethiopia, Kurdistan, Iran/Persia and India, as well as the Sephardi descendants of the Jews expelled from Spain.

The films are part of a movement towards popular narrative movies and more personal documentaries taking advantage of the freedom given by improvements in video cameras and associated digital hardware to pursue a more personal on-screen vision of what it means to be Jewish.

The 2020 festival was held from February 23 to March 2, 2020.

See also
New York Film Festival
New York Jewish Film Festival

References

External links
Official website

1990 establishments in the United States
Arab-American culture in New York City
Asian-American culture in New York City
Cultural festivals in the United States
Ethiopian-American history
Ethiopian-Jewish culture in the United States
Film festivals established in 1990
Film festivals in New York City
Jewish film festivals in the United States
Jews and Judaism in New York City
North African American culture in New York (state)
Sephardi Jewish culture in New York City
Spanish-American culture in New York City
Spanish-Jewish culture in the United States
Yemeni-American culture
Yemeni-Jewish diaspora